Anderson Reed (born September 19, 1990) is an American tennis player.

Reed has a career high ATP singles ranking of 1482 achieved on November 9, 2015. He also has a career high ATP doubles ranking of 370 achieved on October 31, 2016.

Reed made his ATP main draw debut at the 2018 Delray Beach Open in the doubles draw partnering Darian King.

External links

1990 births
Living people
American male tennis players
Sportspeople from Mobile, Alabama
Sportspeople from Fort Lauderdale, Florida
Tennis people from Alabama
Florida State Seminoles men's tennis players